Timothy "Tim" Yap (born January 17, 1977) is a Filipino TV and radio host, actor, newspaper editor, creative director, columnist, club owner and eventologist from Manila, Philippines. He also owns several clubs in the Philippines. He currently hosts The Tim Yap Show which airs weeknights on GMA Network, edits a pop culture section of The Philippine Star entitled "Supreme", and hosted the morning radio talk show The Playground on 99.5 PLAYFM.

Early life and career
Tim Yap was the youngest of seven kids. While attending high school at Saint Jude Catholic School, he won the lead role in Lost in Yonkers, which marked the 25th anniversary of the Repertory Philippines, but his parents and his school didn't allow him to go, so he attended rehearsals in secret, informing the school security guard that he had the permission of his teacher and principal to leave school. "My parents had no clue that I was going to Repertory," he said. "All along they thought that I was just attending a rehearsal for a school play until they read about it in the newspapers." After several roles for young characters, Yap continued on as a production intern for repertory plays just to be involved. He eventually evolved into an events producer, which led him to be sought after to handle product launches and fashion shows.

Yap graduated from De La Salle University with a bachelor's degree in marketing, and later on received his master's degree in entrepreneurship from the Asian Institute of Management. He edited the "Super" section of the Philippine Daily Inquirer, and then left the Inquirer to start the "Supreme" section of the Philippine Star.

Tim Yap hosted the Metro Manila Film Festival Awards in 2010 and 2011. He hosted Miss World Philippines in 2011.

On January 21, 2013, The Tim Yap Show premiered on GMA Network, with Yap as the host of the self-titled celebrity talk show. It is currently in its third season, which premiered Oct. 28, 2013. Aside from television appearances, he hosted the morning radio talk The Playground on 99.5 PLAYFM with Sam Oh and Nikko Ramos.

Awards
In 2007 and 2008, he received the PMPC Star Awards for TV Best Lifestyle Show Hosts award with Raymond Gutierrez and Issa Litton for Living It Up. In 2009, he also won the same award but with co-host Sam Oh for Events Inc.. His show has also won "Best Lifestyle Show" for three consecutive years at the PMPC Star Awards. In 2010, he won Most Stylish Male Host at the StarStudio Celebrity Style Awards. In 2013, he was awarded Outstanding Young Filipino in Entrepreneurship by Gawad Amerika.

Advocacy
Since 2008, Yap has been an active supporter of the Virlaine Foundation, a non-government organization engaged in helping street children. In 2011, he spearheaded the Rice Up for Street Children campaign after having been named as the foundation's Ambassador of Goodwill.

Personal life
Yap proposed to long-time boyfriend Javi Martinez during his 40th birthday on January 19, 2017. The couple got married on December 25, 2017, at The Peninsula New York.

Filmography

Film

Television

References

Filipino radio personalities
Filipino television talk show hosts
Living people
Nightclub owners
1977 births
VJs (media personalities)
De La Salle University alumni
Asian Institute of Management alumni
The Philippine Star people
GMA Network personalities
Filipino television variety show hosts
21st-century Filipino businesspeople
Businesspeople from Metro Manila
Filipino gay actors
Filipino LGBT broadcasters
Gay entertainers